Anhanguera Educacional ( or ) is the second-largest private for-profit professional educational company in Brazil by market value and by number of students, with more than 400,000 students in its education network. The company is the second-largest higher education company in the world by number of students, behind only the American company Apollo Group.

The company operates three types of education—67 campuses, more than 450 poles and over 650 vocational education centers, spread across all states and the Federal District—aimed at adults of middle- and low-income working during the day and study at night, a segment not fully served by institutions of higher education in Brazil. To this end, the company offers a wide range of courses including vocational, undergraduate, postgraduate, and continuing education.

The company is the largest of six educational companies listed on BM&F Bovespa, along with its competitors Estácio, Anima Educação, Abril Educação and Ser Educacional. In 2014 the company underwent a corporate merger with Kroton Educacional. The resulting company became the 17th-largest on the Bovespa Index, with a market value of R$ 24.5 billion and nearly 1 million students.

References

External links
 "The people want to learn" Anhanguera's business model

Private universities and colleges in Brazil
Companies based in São Paulo (state)
Companies listed on B3 (stock exchange)
Education companies of Brazil
Educational institutions established in 1994
1994 establishments in Brazil